Sergio Pinto may refer to:

Sérgio Sousa Pinto (born 1972), Portuguese politician
Sérgio Pinto (footballer, born 1973), Portuguese football midfielder
Sérgio Pinto (footballer, born 1980), Portuguese football midfielder